Gosplodopitomnik is a rural locality (a settlement) in Novonikolayevskoye Rural Settlement, Novonikolayevsky District, Volgograd Oblast, Russia. The population was 3 as of 2010.

Geography 
Gosplodopitomnik is located in steppe, on the Khopyorsko-Buzulukskaya Plain, 21 km northwest of Novonikolayevsky (the district's administrative centre) by road. Korolevsky is the nearest rural locality.

References 

Rural localities in Novonikolayevsky District